Kimmo Yliriesto (born 28 January 1983) is a Finnish former ski jumper who competed from 2000 to 2012.

He won a bronze medal in the team competition at the 2000 Junior World Ski Championships, followed by a team gold medal in the following year's event. He made his World Cup debut on 3 December 2000, finishing 56th in Kuopio. He also did well at Continental Cup level, with many top-10 finishes and two wins. He achieved his first World Cup points with a tenth place in Hakuba on 24 January 2002. His best World Cup result was seventh in Sapporo on 5 February 2005.

References

1983 births
Living people
Finnish male ski jumpers
People from Rovaniemi
Sportspeople from Lapland (Finland)
21st-century Finnish people